Dods may refer to:

People
 Darren Dods (born 1975), Scottish footballer
 Glenn Dods (born 1958), New Zealand retired association football player
 John Dods (rugby union) (1875–1915), Scottish rugby union player
 Lorimer Dods (1900–1981), Australian paediatrician and a pioneer of specialised health care for children
 Marcus Dods (theologian born 1786) (1786–1838), Scottish theologian
 Marcus Dods (theologian born 1834) (1834–1909), Scottish theologian
 Marcus Dods (musician) (1918–1984), British musician
 Mary Diana Dods (1790–1830) Scottish writer 
 Michael Dods (born 1968), Scottish former rugby union player
 Peter Dods (born 1958), Scottish former rugby union player
 Robin Dods (1868–1920), New Zealand-born Australian architect
 Walter A. Dods, Jr., American business executive, banker and philanthropist from Hawaii

Other uses
 Meg Dods, fictional character from Walter Scott's St. Ronan's Well
 Dods (Group) PLC
 Dod's Parliamentary Communications
 Dance of December Souls
 Day of Defeat: Source, a computer game by Valve

See also
 Dodds (disambiguation)
 Dod (disambiguation)